The Slovakia men's national under-18 basketball team is a national basketball team of Slovakia, administered by the Slovak Basketball Association. It represents the country in men's international under-18 basketball competitions.

FIBA U18 European Championship participations

See also
Slovakia men's national basketball team
Slovakia men's national under-16 basketball team
Slovakia women's national under-19 basketball team

References

External links
Official website 
Archived records of Slovakia team participations

U
Basketball
Men's national under-18 basketball teams